Mark E. Dever (born August 28, 1960) is a theologian and the senior pastor of the Capitol Hill Baptist Church in Washington, D.C., and the president of 9Marks (formerly known as the Center for Church Reform), a Christian ministry he co-founded "in an effort to build biblically faithful churches in America. Dever also taught for the faculty of Divinity at the University of Cambridge and also served for two years as an associate pastor of Eden Baptist Church in Cambridge."

Biography
Dever grew up in rural Kentucky  where he was an avid reader. He began reading sections of the World Book Encyclopedia and the Harvard Classics before he was ten years old and based upon his reading and thinking considered himself an agnostic in his younger years. Later rereading and thinking about the Gospels and the change that he saw in the life of Jesus' disciples led him to become a Christian.

Dever earned the degrees of Bachelor of Arts, magna cum laude, from Duke University,  Master of Divinity, summa cum laude, from Gordon-Conwell Theological Seminary, Master of Theology from the Southern Baptist Theological Seminary, and Doctor of Philosophy in ecclesiastical history from Cambridge University and received J.B. Lightfoot Scholarship at Cambridge University from 1989 to 1991. Dever also taught for the faculty of Divinity at Cambridge University while serving for two years as an associate pastor of Eden Baptist Church.

Dever is married with two adult children.

Capitol Hill Baptist Church

Capitol Hill Baptist Church is a Baptist church located on Capitol Hill in Washington, D.C., a few blocks from the United States Capitol. Dever has been the senior pastor of the church since 1994. Capitol Hill Baptist is affiliated with the Southern Baptist Convention.

Dever's ecclesiology and the nine marks
Dever is a Baptist and a Calvinist, but his church polity is notable for its emphasis on an elder led, congregationally ruled church. In addition, he believes that Baptist churches should be led by a plurality of elders as opposed to a single elder.

Dever's main emphasis, as evidenced by 9Marks, is in the realm of ecclesiology. He aims to help Bible-believing churches become healthy by recovering a Biblical view of the church. The 9 marks he provides are his positive prescription for church health. He does not intend the book as a comprehensive ecclesiology or even a comprehensive diagnosis of all the problems that may be found in contemporary churches. The nine marks are:

Dever has written about the adjective "biblical": I try to use 'biblical' as an adjective. And I do so not to say less than 'Reformed' to my Arminian friend, but to say more. I do so to get in what they perceive to be their territory. If I say that our position is 'Reformed,' Arminian or Wesleyan friends can simply dismiss me, thinking that I'm on the other side in an ancient battle, and am about to do no more than rehearse old disagreements. But if I call freshly on that which claims the allegiance of all evangelical parties—the Bible—and I work from there, I require their attention.

Dever's influence
In the last several years, Dever has become a more widely recognized name among conservative evangelicals, due in part to his appearance at large, nationwide conferences such as the Desiring God National Conference, the Ligonier Ministries Conference, the Shepherd's Conference organized by Rev. John F. MacArthur, and the Together for the Gospel conference (which Dever co-founded with C. J. Mahaney, Ligon Duncan, and Al Mohler).

Dever and Capitol Hill Baptist Church in Washington, DC, also train church leaders on a smaller scale. Every year, twelve interns pass through the church's internship program that centers around ecclesiology. Many of these interns have gone on to seminary education, at the same time becoming active reformers in their current local churches. In addition, 9Marks hosts semi-annual weekend conferences at the church where pastors, elders, and seminarians from around the country experience the inner workings of Dever's church.

Dever narrowly missed being elected as the convention's first vice-president in June 2006.

Dever is also a member of the Alliance of Confessing Evangelicals where he leads the Alliance Forum.

Selected works
Dever, Mark E., ed., Polity: A Collection of Historic Baptist Documents-Biblical Arguments on How to Conduct Church Life (2001)
A Display of God's Glory (2001)
Nine Marks of a Healthy Church (2004)
The Deliberate Church - Building Your Ministry on the Gospel (2005)
The Message of the New Testament: Promises Kept (2005)
The Message of the Old Testament: Promises Made (2006)
By Whose Authority? Elders in Baptist Life (2006)
The Gospel and Personal Evangelism (2007)
What is a Healthy Church? (2007)
12 Challenges Churches Face (2008)
In My Place Condemned He Stood: Celebrating the Glory of the Atonement (2008)
It is Well: Expositions on Substitutionary Atonement, with Michael Lawrence (2010)
What Does God Want of us Anyway? (2010)
Preach: Theology Meets Practice, with Greg Gilbert (2012)
The Church: the Gospel Made Visible (2012)
 ' Discipling: How to Help Others Follow Jesus ' (2016)

References

External links
9 Marks
Capitol Hill Baptist Church

1960 births
Alumni of the University of Cambridge
American Calvinist and Reformed ministers
Duke University alumni
Living people
Southern Baptist ministers
American Calvinist and Reformed theologians
American Calvinist and Reformed Christians
20th-century Calvinist and Reformed theologians
21st-century Calvinist and Reformed theologians
Gordon–Conwell Theological Seminary alumni
Southern Baptist Theological Seminary alumni
Ecclesiologists